Emmanuel Misichili (born 6 June 1978) is a Zambian footballer. He played in two matches for the Zambia national football team in 1998 and 2000. He was also named in Zambia's squad for the 2000 African Cup of Nations tournament.

References

1978 births
Living people
Zambian footballers
Zambia international footballers
2000 African Cup of Nations players
Place of birth missing (living people)
Association footballers not categorized by position